Stephen T. Worland (February 19, 1923 – July 29, 2017) was an American economist and professor at the University of Notre Dame. Worland's specialties included the history of economic thought, social economics, and welfare economics. Worland is the author of the book Scholasticism and Welfare Economics, published by the University of Notre Dame Press in 1967. He also authored the Economics and Justice chapter in the book Justice: Views from the Social Sciences, edited by Ronald L. Cohen and published by Springer in 1986.

Biography 
Worland was born in Neoga, Illinois and began his education in the Neoga public schools. During World War II, he served in the United States Navy on the USS Idaho (BB-42) battleship. He held a B.A. and a Ph.D. in Economics from the University of Illinois. His dissertation, completed in 1956, was on the economic thought of St. Thomas Aquinas. Worland held faculty appointments at Michigan State University and the University of Dayton before he joined the University of Notre Dame in 1957. He taught at Notre Dame for 30 years. In 1987, he joined the College of Saint Benedict and Saint John's University faculty for two years as the first occupant of the Clemens Chair in Economics and the Liberal Arts. He died in Columbus, Indiana in 2017.

Research 
Worland's research and writing focus on defining and clarifying economic justice as a social and moral concept.  Worland was an adherent to neoclassical welfare economics and analyzed the writing of Aristotle through the eyes of modern economics.

In his Scholasticism and Welfare Economics book, Worland demonstrated that welfare economics shares the philosophical premises of scholastic economic reasoning and helps clarify the significance of economic efficiency in the scholastic doctrine of the just price. In the Justice: Views from the Social Sciences book, to which he contributed the Economics and Justice chapter, Worland examined classical economics, Marxism, and neoclassical economics, and concluded that distributive justice cannot be achieved in a market society without considering more than simply contributions to production.

Worland's research often focused on Catholic social teaching. For example, his 2001 Just Wages article in the journal First Things explains the teaching of the Catholic Church regarding a living wage for workers.  In his 1994 presentation to The Association for Christian Economics,
Worland wrote that although there should be no such thing as "Christian
Economics" or "Catholic Economics," as "Christian faith will not 
produce a body of economic knowledge different from that to be 
discovered by honest, secular scientific effort,” the Judeo-Christian 
message makes an important and unique contribution to an understanding 
of a modern market society.

Teaching philosophy 
Worland wrote that economics should be taught in such a way that 
students learn about the real-world problems of injustice and human 
development, and not just the theory and mathematical underpinnings of 
economics. In 1975, in Forum for Social Economics, he wrote that 
at Notre Dame, where he taught, a decision was made to restructure the 
Ph.D. program to focus on socioeconomic issues and social justice, and 
to teach and research the fundamental problems of social economy that 
"should be a major concern for every economist with a truly humane 
interest in his profession."

Honors 
In 1987, Worland was awarded the Reinhold Niebuhr
Award, an annual award that honors a faculty member or college 
administrator whose work and life promote or exemplify social justice.

In 1993, Worland was awarded the Thomas F. Divine award. Named for one of the founding fathers of the Association for Social Economics,
the Thomas F. Divine Award is presented annually to an Association 
member who over a lifetime has made important contributions to social 
economics and the social economy.

Selected publications

Books
 Scholasticism and Welfare Economics. Notre Dame, IN: University of Notre Dame Press, 1967.

Articles and Presentations

 "Response," in 

 The Right and the Good: And the Retrieval of Welfare Economics. Presented for The Association for Christian Economics. 1994.

Book Chapters
 Adam Smith: Economic Justice and the Founding Father. In Skurski, Roger (Ed.).  New Directions in Economic Justice. Notre Dame, IN: University of Notre  Dame Press, 1983.
 Economics and Justice. In Ronald L. Cohen (Ed.), Justice: Views from the Social Sciences. New York: Springer, 1986.
 The Investment Decision as Moral Choice: The Perspective of  Centesimus Annus. In Edward O'Boyle (Ed.), Social Economics: Premises,  Findings, and Policies. London: Routledge, 1996.

Book Reviews
 Book Review: Religion and Economic Justice edited by Michael Zweig. Review of Radical Political Economics 26.2 (1994): 131–134.
 Book Review: The Ethical Foundations of Economics by John J. Piderit. Journal of Economic Literature 33.1. (1995): 193–195.
 Book Review: Economics as a Moral Science: The Political Economy of  Adam Smith by Jeffrey T. Young. Journal of the History of Economic  Thought 21:01. (1999): 101–103.
 Book Review: The Legacy of Scholasticism in Economic Thought: Antecedents of Choice and Power by Odd Langholm. Journal of the History of Economic Thought 21:03. (1999): 325–327.

References 

20th-century American economists
Economists from Illinois
University of Illinois alumni
Michigan State University faculty
University of Notre Dame faculty
University of Dayton faculty
1923 births
2017 deaths
People from Cumberland County, Illinois
Military personnel from Illinois
Writers from Illinois
Historians of economic thought